Ghaus, Ghous, Ghos or Gawth is an Arabic name. Notable people with this name include:

 Adnan Ghaus (born 1990), Pakistani cricket player
 Aisha Ghaus Pasha (born 1962), Pakistani politician
 Ghaus Bakhsh Bizenjo (1917–1989), Pakistani politician
 Ghaus Mohammad (1915–1982), Indian tennis player
 Ghaus Pak, a title of Abdul Qadir Gilani (1078–1166), Sufi preacher and theologian
 Gholam Ghaus Z., Afghan-German citizen
 Ghulam Ghaus, Afghan politician
 Ghulam Ghaus (Indian politician), Indian politician from Bihar
 Ghulam Ghaus Hazarvi (1896–1981), Pakistani politician
 Ghulam Ghaus Khan, Indian freedom fighter from Rawalpindi
 Jarnail Ghaus Khan (–1814), Indian general in the Sikh Empire
 Muhammad Ghawth (1500–1562), Indian Sufi saint from Gwalior
 Mohammed Ghous Mosque, mosque built by him in Ahmedabad, India

Arabic-language surnames
Arabic given names